Lowther is a civil parish in Eden District, Cumbria. Within the parish are the settlements of Lowther Village, Newtown or Lowther Newtown, Hackthorpe, Whale, and Melkinthorpe. At the 2001 census the parish had a population of 402, increasing to 465 at the 2011 Census.

The parish council meets at the Lowther Parish Hall in Hackthorpe. Lowther Endowed Primary School is also at Hackthorpe.

Most of the land in the parish belongs to the Lowther family estates. The family seat of the Lowthers was formerly Lowther Castle which is now a ruin but set in spectacular parkland.

Hackthorpe once had its own magistrates' court which is now part of the village's pub.

A large part of the parish is within the Lake District National Park.

See also

Listed buildings in Lowther, Cumbria

References

External links 
Cumbria County History Trust: Lowther (nb: provisional research only – see Talk page)
www.lowther.co.uk The website of the Lowther Estates

Civil parishes in Cumbria